The 1990 Girabola was the 12th season of top-tier football competition in Angola. Atlético Petróleos de Luanda were the defending champions.

The league comprised 14 teams, none of which were relegated.

Petro de Luanda were crowned champions, winning their 7th title, and fifth in a row, while there were no relegations.

Mikayela Diakananwa aka Mona of Petro de Luanda finished as the top scorer with 17 goals.

Changes from the 1989 season
Promoted: None
Relegated: None

League table

Results

Season statistics

Top scorer
 Mikayela Diakananwa Mona

Champions

External links
Federação Angolana de Futebol

Girabola seasons
Angola
Angola